Christian Freeling (born 1 February 1947, in Enschede, Netherlands) is a Dutch game designer and inventor of abstract strategy games, notably Dameo, Grand Chess, Havannah, and Hexdame.

Freeling's designs cover a range of game types. Several of his games are endeavors to improve on established games that he concluded are flawed or limited in some way, while some introduce familiar game mechanics into uncommon settings. He also regularly translates rules for orthogonal board games to the hexagonal grid, resulting in new versions with altered properties – usually enhanced strategy and tactics options, and fewer draws.

"Christian's games often embody a desire to get to the heart of the concepts used in abstract games. This is most clearly displayed by his minimalist chess variant, Chad, and his version of column checkers, Emergo."

Among all his games, Freeling considers Dameo, Emergo, Grand Chess, Storisende, Sygo, and Symple to be his most important, with Emergo as his personal favourite.

Notable games

Dameo is a draughts/checkers variant inspired by International draughts and a variant of Turkish draughts called Croda invented by Ljuban Dedić. Dameo utilizes all 64 squares of the checkerboard and uses both orthogonal and diagonal movement, although capture is orthogonal only. It also introduces linear movement of men where lines of men of any length may move forward together, similar to Epaminondas or Bushka. This was added to speed play, enhance tactics, and curtail draws. "Considerable work has already gone into analyzing Dameo, and some remarkable discoveries have been made in the area of endgame positions with just a few pieces left." 

Grand Chess utilizes the same compound pieces as Capablanca Chess, but the starting setup  the rooks, giving immediate freedom of movement and "yields the better game" . Internet Grand Chess World Championships have been held, and NOST sponsored yearly tournaments beginning in 1998. A Grand Chess tournament in Yerevan in 1996 attracted 21 chess masters.

Havannah, a connection game using hexagonal cells like Hex, offers "a subtler strategy and much more varied tactics" . The game was published by Ravensburger in 1981 and marketed for ten years, winning critical acclaim. In 2002, Freeling offered a €1,000 prize for any computer program in ten years that could beat him in even one game in a 10-game match, believing the nature of Havannah made the game difficult to program and therefore best played by human strategic thinking. In October 2012, via Internet, a 10-game match was conducted between Freeling and three Havannah bots. Freeling won by +7−3=0, losing two games to Lajkonik (Poland) and one game to Castro (Canada).

Hexdame exactly translates international draughts rules to a hexagonal gameboard, increasing options for moves and tactics, and reducing draws. The World Draughts Federation (FMJD) has actively promoted Hexdame as an alternative to the 10×10 game.

Personal life
On 13 May 2000 in Enschede, SE Fireworks exploded 120 meters from Freeling's home, killing 23 people, wounding 947, and destroying 400 houses including Freeling's. Although uninjured, all his possessions and game materials were lost in the tragedy.

Freeling has three sons (Demian, born 1975; Myron, born 1978; Falco, born 1993) and one daughter (Ninja, born 1982). Demian invented Congo, a xiangqi variant, in 1982 when nearly 8 years old.

Games invented

Chess variants

 Chad (1979)
 Chakra (1980)
 Yari shogi (1981)
 Rotary (1981)
 Shakti (1982)
 Caïssa (1982)
 Loonybird (1983)
 Dragonfly (1983)
 Grand Chess (1984)
 Cyclix (2011)
 King's Colour (2021)
 Royal Guard (2021, with Chris Huntoon)

Connection games
 Havannah (1979)
 Pylyx (2011)
 Scware (2012)
 Inertia (2013)
 Multiplicity (2013)
 Query (2010)
 Rondo (early 1980s)
 Starweb (2017)
 KnightVision (2021)
 Lox (2021)
 Uknight (2021)
 KnightShade (2021)
 Loops 'n Leaps (2021)

Elimination games
 Bushka (1981)
 Hexdame (1979)
 Emergo (1980, with Ed van Zon)
 Crossfire (early 1980s)
 Dameo (2000)
 Pit of Pillars (2013)
 Loca (2020)

Territory games
 Symple (2010, with Benedikt Rosenau)
 Sygo (2010)
 Mu (1982)
 Phalanx (1981)
 Medusa (1981)
 Lotus (1981)
 Macbeth (1981)
 Dominions (1984)
 Square Off (1982)
 Triccs (2012)
 Io (2014)
 Storisende (2018)
 Qascade (2020)
 XiaGo (2020)
 Migong (2020, with Luis Bolaños Mures)
 Cannons & Bullets (2021)
 Notubytu (2022)
 Renegado (2022)

Mancala variants
 MiniMancala (late 1970s)
 The Glass Bead Game (late 1970s)
 Shakala (2022)

Race games
 Trackgammon (pre 1976)
 Breakthrough (1982)
 Jump Sturdy (2010)

Others
 Hexade (1979)
 Mephisto (1979)
 Hanniball (2009, with Arty Sandler)
 Swish and Squeeze
 Monkey Trap (2010)
 Grabber (2011)
 King's Castle (2020)
 DropZone (2020)
 WedgeLock (2020)
 Crossbars (2021)
 Zumo (2022)
 China Tangle (2022)

Notes

References

Bibliography

Further reading

External links
 Official website MindSports • The ArenA
 Official website MindSports • The Pit 
 Christian Freeling's Grand Chess by Hans Bodlaender, The Chess Variant Pages

Board game designers
People from Enschede
1947 births
Living people
Chess variant inventors